Mascarin may refer to:

 Conservatoire botanique national de Mascarin, a national conservatory and botanical garden
 Mascarene parrot (Mascarinus mascarin), of Réunion in the Indian Ocean
 Mascarin Peak, the highest mountain on Marion Island
 Susan Mascarin (born 1964), American tennis player